Ambt Delden is a former municipality in the Dutch province of Overijssel. It consisted of the countryside surrounding the city of Delden, which was a separate municipality.

Ambt Delden existed from 1818 to 2001, when it became a part of Hof van Twente.

It is a little known fact that the typical dutch dessert of "Vanillevla" found its origins with farmers from the area.

References

Notes

Municipalities of the Netherlands disestablished in 2001
Former municipalities of Overijssel
Hof van Twente